The grey-hooded sunbird (Aethopyga primigenia) is a species of bird in the family Nectariniidae. It is endemic to the Philippines. Its natural habitat is tropical moist montane forests.

Description 

eBird describes the bird as "A small bird of lower-elevation montane forest on Mindanao. Has a gray hood and chest, an olive-green back and wings, a white upper belly, a yellow lower belly and sides, and a white-tipped tail. Male has a green forehead and cheek patches. Males from northeast Mindanao have an additional yellow stripe down the upper chest. Similar to Apo and Tboli Sunbirds, but Gray-hooded has a white upper belly. Voice includes a fast series of high-pitched “whip!” notes."

Subspecies 
Two subspecies are recognized:

 Aethopyga primigenia primigenia: Found in West, Central and Southern Mindanao; plainer breast
 Aethopyga primigenia diuatae: Found in Northeast Mindanao; grayer overall appearance, white streak with yellow spot on breast

Distribution and habitat 
It occurs in tropical moist montane forest and forest edges above altitudes of 1,000 m, but may reach limits of 1,700 m. It is often seen around banana flowers.

Status 
IUCN has assessed this bird as a least-concern species in 2020, with it formerly being near threatened. Despite its limited range it is said to be locally common, possibly occurring in densities of close to 50 birds per km2. The population is estimated at around 20,000 - 49,999 mature individuals. As it occurs in rugged and inaccessible mountains, this has allowed a large portion of its habitat to remain intact. However, there it is still affected by habitat loss through deforestation, mining, land conversion and slash-and-burn - though not to the same extent as in lowland forests.  

Several proposals have been made to strengthen conservation action, including granting protection to areas of suitable habitat and regularly monitoring important areas such as Mt. Hamiguitan.

References

grey-hooded sunbird
Birds of Mindanao
grey-hooded sunbird
grey-hooded sunbird
Taxonomy articles created by Polbot